Post mill Rosmalen (Dutch: Standerdmolen Rosmalen) is a post mill in Rosmalen, Netherlands. The mill is situated in the neighbourhood of Molenhoek. The mill was built in 1732 on a natural slope. This slope is accented with old millstones.

In the past there were several mills in Rosmalen, but this mill is the only one remaining. After the Second World War the mill was damaged, and there were plans to demolish the mill. Because the mill became a rijksmonument, the mill was restored. The owner of the mill is the municipality of 's-Hertogenbosch

Windmills completed in 1732
Grinding mills in the Netherlands
Post mills in the Netherlands
Rijksmonuments in North Brabant
Windmills in North Brabant
Buildings and structures in 's-Hertogenbosch